Luigi De Giudici (December 12, 1887 – February 16, 1955) was an Italian painter of the Venetian anti-academic movement in the first years of the twentieth century. His works were exhibited at Ca' Pesaro between 1912 and 1920 and at the International Exposition of Paris (1937).

Life
He was born in Pavia di Udine of Friuli origins on his father's side and Carnia origins on his mother's side. He artistically grew up in Venice. Starting from the representation of a living room world of liberty taste, also through the irony of caricature, he was sensible to the avant-garde movements of the beginning of the twentieth century, from Futurism to Expressionism, from the movement of Pont-Aven to the Secessions in Vienna and Munich.
He artistically formed in the unrepeatable melting pot of styles and newness of the Barbantini's Ca' Pesaro of the 1910s. Among his friends were Boccioni, Gino Rossi, Arturo Martini, Mauroner, Pellis, and Pomi.

His career was interrupted in 1919 when,  at the age of 32 years, he decided to stop painting. He got married and had six children, and made his living by managing his properties. He was Mayor of Oderzo from 1925 to 1927.

He went back to painting in 1931 for personal pleasure and finally stopped in 1937. When he died in Venice in 1955, his early paintings were found in a locked chest. Only by chance his son Angelo found his name in a list of exhibitors of Ca' Pesaro and in 1992 Luigi De Guidici started to be studied.

Works

Exhibitions 
1912
Venezia, Esposizione Permanente d'Arte e d'Industrie Veneziane, Ca' Pesaro, 29 June - 11 October
1913
Venezia, Opera Bevilacqua La Masa - Esposizione Permanente d'Arte e d'Industrie Veneziane, Ca'Pesaro, 18 May - 5 October
1915
Venezia, Esposizione di bozzetti degli artisti veneziani, Hotel Vittoria, 8–22 February
1919
Milano, Grande Esposizione Nazionale Futurista, 'Galleria Centrale d'Arte', marzo, p. 10
Venezia, Esposizione d'Arte in Palazzo Pesaro, Ca' Pesaro, 15 July - 5 October
Lido di Venezia, Esposizione Nazionale di Belle Arti, 13 July
Lido di Venezia, Mostra di bozzetti di pittura e scultura indetta dal Gruppo femminile dell'Associazione Trento - Trieste Sezione di Venezia, 17 August - 7 October
Venezia, I^ Esposizione d'Arte del Circolo Artistico, Galleria Geri - Boralevi, 29 December - 2 February
1920
Venezia, Esposizione Permanente d'Arti e d'Industrie veneziane, Ca' Pesaro, 17 July - 30 September
1921
Treviso, Prima Mostra Regionale d'Arte, Palazzo Gabelli, September
Venezia, Esposizione del Circolo Artistico, July
1927
Treviso, VII Mostra d'Arte Trevigiana, Salone dei 300, 16 October - 11 November
1936
Venezia, XXVII Esposizione dell'Opera Bevilacqua La Masa VII del Sindacato Interprovinciale Fascista Belle Arti, Palazzo Reale, Sala Napoleonica, 15 April - 30 May
1937
Venezia, XXVIII Esposizione dell'Opera Bevilacqua La Masa VIII del Sindacato Interprovinciale Fascista Belle Arti, Palazzo Reale, Sala Napoleonica, 15 April - 30 May
Parigi, Mostra d'Arte Italiana all'Esposizione Universale di Parigi
1999
Venezia, Emblemi d'Arte da Boccioni a Tancredi. Cent'anni della Fondazione Bevilacqua La Masa 1899-1999, Galleria Bevilacqua La Masa, 6 March - 2 May
Modena, La Pittura a Venezia dagli anni di Ca' Pesaro alla Nuova Oggettività 1905-1940, Palazzo Montecuccoli, Fondazione Cassa di Risparmio di Modena 28 November - 30 January
2000
Venezia, Gigi De Giudici 1887 - 1955, Fondazione Querini Stampalia, 9 November - 10 December
2001
Venezia, Donazione Eugenio Da Venezia, Fondazione Querini Stampalia, 10 November - 10 December
2002
Oderzo, Gigi De Giudici e Oderzo, 1887-1955 Tra Futurismo e Novecento, Palazzo Foscolo, 26 April - 30 June
2004
Mestre, Gigi De Giudici, 1887-1955 Tra modernità e tradizione, Centro Culturale Candiani, 29 January - 15 February
2005
Tolmezzo, Luigi De Giudici Pittore Futurista in Carnia dal 1910 al 1920, Palazzo Frisacco, 30 July - 22 August
Spinea, De Giudici Olii e disegni, Oratorio di Santa Maria Assunta, 9–30 September
2007
Torre di Mosto, Tra mare e laguna, Museo del paesaggio di Torre di Mosto, 16 June - 2 September
2008
Torre di Mosto, La seduzione del paesaggio, Museo del paesaggio di Torre di Mosto, 12 July - 7 September

Further reading (in Italian)
Gigi De Giudici 1887-1955  (catalogo della mostra, Fondazione Querini Stampalia), a cura di Giuseppina dal Canton, Venezia, Donazione Eugenio Da Venezia, quaderno n°7, Venezia, 9 Novembre-10 Dicembre2000
Dizionario del Futurismo, a cura di E. Godoli, Ed. Vallecchi, Firenze, 2001, pp. 361–362
Bromojodicherie tolmezzine 1914-17 ovvero….la gente di Tumiec durante la Grande Guerra nei disegni e caricature di Luigi De Giudici, di Pier Giuseppe Avanzato, Ed. Andrea Moro, Tolmezzo, 2005
Dal "vero" accademico al naturalismo novecentista passando per l'avanguardia: le opere donate dagli Eredi De Giudici al Fondo Da Venezia, in Donazione Eugenio Da Venezia, Fondazione Scientifica Querini Stampalia, Venezia, 2001, pp. 79– 80 ("Quaderni della Donazione Eugenio Da Venezia", 8) Sito Università di Venezia

External links
Further information: http://www.gatta.cloud/ldg 

1887 births
1955 deaths
Politicians of Veneto
People from the Province of Udine
Italian Futurist painters
People from Oderzo
20th-century Italian painters
20th-century Italian male artists
Italian male painters
Artists from Venice
20th-century Italian politicians
Mayors of places in Veneto
National Fascist Party politicians